Kathryn Cave (born 1948 in Aldershot, Hampshire, England) is a British children's book author. She was awarded the very first international UNESCO prize for Children's and Young People's Literature in the Service of Tolerance for Something Else. The book was later made into a TV comic series by TV Loonland. A theatre company, Tall Stories, has adapted Something Else as a children's production, and they ran a UK tour in Autumn 2009.

She has three children, Eleanor, Joseph, and Alice, and six grandchildren. Kathryn has previously worked as an editor for Penguin and Basil Blackwell, and she currently works under contract for Frances Lincoln, an independent publishing house in North London.

She lives in Hampstead, North London.

Books
 Dragonrise (1984)
 Just My Luck (1987)
 Poor Little Mary (1989)
Henry Hobbs, Alien (1990)
 Running Battles (1992)
Andrew Takes the Plunge (1994)
 Best Friends for Ever (1994)
Jumble (1995)
The Emperor's Gruckle Hound (1996)
William and the Wolves (1999)
Septimus Similon, Practising Wizard (2000)
Henry Hobbs, Space Voyager (2001)
Henry Hobbs and the Lost Planet (2002)

Picture books
Out for the Count (1991) illustrated by Chris Riddell
Something Else (1994) illustrated by Chris Riddell
 Horatio Happened (1998) illustrated by Chris Riddell
 W is for World (1998) illustrated by Oxfam
 Henry's Song (2000) illustrated by Sue Hendra
 The Boy Who Became an Eagle (2000) illustrated by Nick Maland
 The Brave Little Grork (2002) illustrated by Nick Maland
 One Child, One Seed (2002) illustrated by Oxfam
 You've Got Dragons (2003) illustrated by Nick Maland
 That's What Friends Do (2004) illustrated by Nick Maland
 Friends (2005) illustrated by Nick Maland

Awards
 1997 Die Kinder- und Jugendbuchliste (RB/SR) in Germany for Something Else
 1997 UNESCO prize for Children's and Young People's Literature in the Service of Tolerance for Something Else

References

Living people
British children's writers
1948 births
Writers from Aldershot